Suzanne Moore Martin is an American television producer and writer. She is best known for creating Hot in Cleveland (2010–15). Her writing and producing credits include Ellen, Frasier and The Soul Man. She also created the television series Maybe It's Me and Hot Properties and Crowded.

Early life and career
Suzanne was raised in Cumberland, Rhode Island and graduated from Cumberland High School. Before pursuing a career in television, Martin was a vice president in the New York City office of Quinn, Brein & Block, a Los Angeles-based public relations concern, She later graduated from Barnard College. Her father, Robert R. Moore, was a claims supervisor for the American Mutual Insurance Company in Providence, Rhode Island, where her mother, Alice M. Moore, was the senior supervisor with the Rhode Island Department of Social Services.

Her first foray in television was writing for the television series The Good Life. She went on to win two Emmy Awards as a part of a writing ensemble for Frasier.

She is the creator of the award-winning show Hot in Cleveland. She serves as an executive producer and writer for the show.

Personal life
She married television producer and writer Jeff Martin in 1986. They have two daughters.

Television credits

References

External links

American women television producers
American television writers
Barnard College alumni
Emmy Award winners
Living people
People from Cumberland, Rhode Island
Television producers from New York City
American women television writers
Place of birth missing (living people)
Year of birth missing (living people)
Screenwriters from New York (state)
Screenwriters from Rhode Island
20th-century American screenwriters
20th-century American women writers
21st-century American screenwriters
21st-century American women writers